This is the discography for American country music artist Pat Green.

Studio albums

Live albums

Collaborative albums

Singles

Other charted songs
All songs charted from unsolicited airplay on the country chart.

Note
A^ "Way Back Texas" originally charted in 2006 from unsolicited airplay that brought it to No. 48 before its release. It was officially released as a single in 2007.

Guest singles

Music videos

References

Country music discographies
Discographies of American artists